Paler is a surname. Notable people with the surname include:

 Binyomin Paler (1908–2000), Haredi rosh yeshiva and Talmudist in the United States
 Octavian Paler (1926–2007), Romanian writer, journalist, and politician

Romanian-language surnames
Jewish surnames